Shamim Haider Tirmazi is a Pakistani scholar, researcher, teacher and writer who taught education at the University of Education for 36 years.

Publications

 Tirmazi's Ph.D. Thesis, "A historical study of the determinants and Evolution of Islamic education system" was published in 1993. The title of the book was ‘Islam ka Nizam-i-Taaleem’.
 Two books on literary criticism ‘Adab Aasaar’ and ‘Adab aur Asar’ were published in 1996 and 2010 .
 Three books on humor - Phoowar (Light essays), Hanste Bolte Lafz (Social Columns), and Mein aur Merey (Personal Sketches) were published in 1986, 2003 and 2004 respectively. In 2014, these three books were published in the form of an ‘Omni edition’ with the title "Shaguftani".

External links
http://www.iub.edu.pk/jer/JOURNAL/JER_Vol13_No2.pdf
http://www.cosspak.org/thesis.php?id=335&th=Shamim%20Haider%20Tirmazi: The Historical Review of the Development of Islamic Educational System

1939 births
Living people
People from Saharanpur